Pierre Ouellette (born 1945) is a science fiction author. He lives in Portland, Oregon. He wrote the science fiction thrillers The Deus Machine (Villard Books, 1994) and The Third Pandemic (Pocket Books, 1996).  Writing under the name of Pierre Davis, his third novel A Breed Apart was published in 2009 by Bantam-Dell.  A fourth book, entitled Origin Unknown was published in July 2011. His fifth book, titled The Forever Man, was published in January 2014 by Alibi Books, a Random House imprint. His latest novel, Bakersfield, a crime story set in mid-1950s California, was due out in September 2018 from Jorvik Press. In 2000, Ouellette sold the advertising and PR agency he co-founded, and works as a video and film producer and guitarist when not writing.

References

External links

20th-century American novelists
21st-century American novelists
American male novelists
American science fiction writers
1945 births
Living people
20th-century American male writers
21st-century American male writers